A yojana (Devanagari: योजन;) is a measure of distance that was used in ancient India, Thailand and Myanmar. A yojana is about 12–15 km.

Edicts of Ashoka (3rd century BCE)
Ashoka, in his Major Rock Edict No.13, gives a distance of 600 yojanas between India, presumably Pataliputra, and "where the Yona king named Antiyoga (is ruling)", identified as King Antiochus II Theos, whose capital was in Babylon. Since Pataliputra and Babylon are at a distance of about 4000 km, this would give a yojana of about 7 km.

Yojana as per Vishnu Purana
Yojana is defined in Chapter 6 of Book 1 of the Vishnu Purana (one of the eighteen Mahapuranas) as follows:

Units

Variations on length
The length of the yojana varies depending on the different standards adopted by different Indian astronomers. A. C. Bhaktivedanta Swami Prabhupada gives the equivalent length of a yojana as about  throughout his translations of the Bhagavata Purana. Some other traditional Indian scholars give measurements between 6.4 km and 8 km (4–5 miles) or thereabouts.

See also

Hindu cosmology
History of measurement systems in India
Hindu units of time
Palya
Rajju
Sayana
List of numbers in Hindu scriptures

References

Further reading
 
 The Artha Shaastra of Kautilya, Penguin Books
 Valmiki Ramayana
 Dictionary of Historical and Related Terms

Customary units in India
Hindu astronomy
Obsolete units of measurement
Units of length